The 1944 All-American Girls Professional Baseball League season marked the second season of the circuit. The AAGPBL expanded in its second year of existence by adding two franchises to the original four-team format. At this point, the Milwaukee Chicks and the Minneapolis Millerettes joined the Kenosha Comets, Racine Belles, Rockford Peaches and South Bend Blue Sox. The number of games in the schedule also increased to 118, while the final Scholarship Series faced first-half winner Kenosha against Milwaukee, second-half champ, in a Best of Seven Series.

In that season the ball was decreased in size from 12 inches to 11½ inches. In addition, the base paths were lengthened to 68 feet. As a result, batting averages decreased to low .200 as pitching continued to dominate for second straight season. No batters surpassed the .300 mark, with South Bend's Betsy Jochum collecting the highest average at .296. Once again Kenosha's Helen Nicol led all pitchers in earned run average, turning in a minuscule 0.98 mark, while Minneapolis' Annabelle Lee hurled the first perfect game in league history against Kenosha. Among pitchers who threw no-hitters were  Rockford's Carolyn Morris (two) and Mary Pratt, and Kenosha' Elise Harney and Nicol.

The final series was extended from three to seven games. The series went to the limit of seven games and Milwaukee clinched the championship, four to three. Despite losing Game 1, Connie Wisniewski earned the four wins to set a series record, pitching a four-hit shutout in decisive Game 7 to give the Chicks the title.

Although the Chicks won the championship, they had no local financial backing and could not compete with the American Association Milwaukee Brewers. In fact, the Chicks were forced to play all seven games of the series at Kenosha's Lake Front Stadium because the Brewers were using the Borchert Field in Milwaukee. In addition, the high ticket prices charged for AAGPBL games failed to encourage significant fan support. Due to lack of community support and skepticism of journalists, the Chicks moved to Grand Rapids, Michigan prior to the 1945 season.

The AAGPBL drew 260,000 fans during the 1944 season, which represented a 49 percent raise over the previous year.

Standings

First half

Second half

Composite records

Postseason

Batting statistics

Pitching statistics

All-Star Game

See also
1944 Major League Baseball season

Sources

External links
AAGPBL Official Website
AAGPBL Records
Baseball Historian files
The Diamond Angle profiles and interviews
SABR Projects – Jim Sargent articles
YouTube videos

All-American Girls Professional Baseball League seasons
1940s in women's baseball
All-American Girls Professional Baseball League season
All